The Commemorative Medal of the Reign of King Leopold II was a Belgian civilian and later military and police forces medal originally established on 21 July 1905 by royal decree to commemorate the 40th year of the reign of King Leopold II. 

The medal was initially awarded to civil servants with a minimum of 20 years of honourable service between 1865 and 1905 who were eligible for the Civic Decoration for long service. It was reissued slightly modified (see description below) in 1951 at the request of veterans' groups, to veterans and military personnel who had a minimum of one year's good and faithful service between 16 December 1865 and 18 December 1909. The medal was once again reissued for a third time in 1952, again slightly modified, to members and veterans of the Force Publique who also had a minimum of one year's good and faithful service between 1 July 1885 and 18 December 1909.  The one year's minimum service requirement was later removed by royal decrees in 1959 and 1960.

Award description
The Commemorative Medal of the Reign of King Leopold II was a 33 mm in diameter gilt bronze circular medal. Its obverse bore the relief image of a cross pattée with a central medallion bearing the left profile of King Leopold II; the cross was superimposed over a wreath of laurel and oak branches along the medal's circumference.  The reverse bore the same basic design except for the king's profile which was replaced by the years inscribed in relief on two rows "1865 1905" for the initial type (1905) awarded to civil servants,  "1865 1909" for the second type (1951) awarded to the military and "1885 1909" to the Force Publique (1952).

The medal was suspended by a ring through a ribbon and bow-shaped suspension loop from a 37 mm wide silk moiré red ribbon with a 3 mm wide central black stripe bordered on both sides by 5 mm wide yellow stripes.

Notable recipients (partial list)
The individuals listed below were awarded the Commemorative Medal of the Reign of King Leopold II:
 Lieutenant General Alphonse Verstraete
 Lieutenant General Joseph Leroy
 Lieutenant General Harry Jungbluth
 Cavalry Lieutenant General Baron Albert du Roy de Blicquy
 Lieutenant General Sir Antonin de Selliers de Moranville
 Lieutenant General Félix Wielemans
 Lieutenant General Baron Louis de Ryckel
 Lieutenant General Baron Émile Dossin de Saint-Georges
 Lieutenant General Baron Honoré Drubbel
 Lieutenant General Count Gérard-Mathieu Leman
 Lieutenant General Victor Bertrand
 Lieutenant General Joseph Jacquet
 Lieutenant General Baron Jules Jacques de Dixmude
 Lieutenant General Georges Guiette
 Lieutenant General Albert Lantonnois van Rode
 Lieutenant General Baron Armand de Ceuninck
 Lieutenant General Aloïs Biebuyck
 Cavalry Lieutenant General Baron Léon de Witte de Haelen
 Cavalry Lieutenant General Vicount Victor Buffin de Chosal
 Cavalry Lieutenant General Jules De Blauwe
 Cavalry Lieutenant General Count André de Jonghe d’Ardoye
 Cavalry Lieutenant General Fernand du Roy de Blicquy
 Cavalry Lieutenant General Baron Emile de Wykerslooth de Rooyensteyn
 Cavalry Lieutenant General Gustave Fivé
 Lieutenant General Baron Théophile Wahis
 Lieutenant General Louis Cuvelier
 Lieutenant General Charles-Joseph Lambeau
 Lieutenant General Baron Albert Donny
 Lieutenant General François-Guillaume Boÿ Aert
 Lieutenant General Emile Libbrecht
 Cavalry Lieutenant General Count Frédéric van der Stegen de Putte
 Cavalry Major General Count Théodore-Louis d’Oultremont
 Governor Baron Raymond de Kerchove d’Exaerde
 Governor Camille Count de Briey Baron de Landres
 Ambassador Count Charles Maximilien de Lalaing
 Ambassador Baron Albéric Fallon
 Ambassador Count Conrad de Buisseret-Steenbecque de Blarenghien
 Ambassador Baron Ludovic Moncheur
 Count Edmond Carton de Wiart

See also
 Leopold II of Belgium
 Monarchy of Belgium
 Congo Free State
 Force Publique
 Democratic Republic of the Congo
 List of Orders, Decorations and Medals of the Kingdom of Belgium

References

Other sources
 Quinot H., 1950, Recueil illustré des décorations belges et congolaises, 4e Edition. (Hasselt)
 Cornet R., 1982, Recueil des dispositions légales et réglementaires régissant les ordres nationaux belges. 2e Ed. N.pl.,  (Brussels)
 Borné A.C., 1985, Distinctions honorifiques de la Belgique, 1830-1985 (Brussels)

External links
 Bibliothèque royale de Belgique (In French)
 Les Ordres Nationaux Belges (In French)

Orders, decorations, and medals of Belgium
Military awards and decorations of Belgium
Civil awards and decorations of Belgium
Awards established in 1905
1905 establishments in Belgium